Sweden competed at the 1996 Summer Olympics in Atlanta, United States. 177 competitors, 111 men and 66 women, took part in 109 events in 22 sports.

Medalists

Archery

Swedish men returned to Olympic archery with a silver medal performance by Magnus Petersson.  Veteran Göran Bjerendal was defeated in the first round.

Women's Individual Competition:
 Jenny Sjöwall → Round of 32, 26th place (1-1)
 Christa Backman → Round of 64, 35th place (0-1)
 Kristina Persson-Nordlander → Round of 64, 43rd place (0-1)

Men's Individual Competition:
 Magnus Petersson → Final, Silver Medal (5-1)
 Mikael Larsson → Round of 32, 21st place (1-1)
 Göran Bjerendal → Round of 64, 34th place (0-1)

Women's Team Competition:
 Sjöwall, Backman, and Persson → Quarterfinal, 7th place (1-1)

Men's Team Competition:
 Petersson, Larsson, and Bjerendal → Quarterfinal, 6th place (1-1)

Athletics

Men's 400m Hurdles
Sven Nylander
Heat — 49.54s 
Semi Final — 48.21s
Final — 47.98s (→ 4th place)

Men's Marathon
 Anders Szalkai — 2:24.27 (→ 64th place)

Men's Javelin Throw
 Dag Wennlund 
 Qualification — 75.24m (→ did not advance)

Men's Hammer Throw 
 Tore Gustafsson
 Qualification — 71.02m (→ did not advance)

Women's High Jump
 Kajsa Bergqvist
 Qualification — 1.90m (→ did not advance)

Badminton

Jan-Eric Antonsson, Peter Axelsson, Catrine Bengtsson, Maria Bengtsson, Margit Borg, Astrid Crabo, Tomas Johansson, Pär-Gunnar Jönsson, Christine Magnusson, Jens Olsson

Beach Volleyball

Tom Englen and Fredrik Petersson — 17th place overall

Boxing

Men's Light Flyweight (48 kg)
Stefan Ström
 First Round — Lost to Yosvani Aguilera (Cuba), referee stopped contest in second round

Men's Bantamweight (54 kg)
John Larbi
 First Round — Lost to Arnaldo Mesa (Cuba), 5-19

Men's Light Middleweight (71 kg)
Roger Pettersson
 First Round — Defeated Shokhrat Kourbanov (Turkmenistan), 7-2
 Second Round — Lost to Antonio Perugino (Italy), 4-18

Men's Light Heavyweight (81 kg)
Ismael Koné
 First Round — Defeated Ilkham Kerimov (Azerbaijan), 22-3
 Second Round — Lost to Thomas Ulrich (Germany), 9-24

Men's Heavyweight (91 kg)
Kwamena Turkson
 First Round — Defeated Young-Sam Ko (South Korea), 12-8 
 Second Round — Lost to Félix Savón (Cuba), knock-out in first round

Men's Super Heavyweight (> 91 kg)
Attila Levin
 First Round — Bye
 Second Round — Defeated Jean-François Bergeron (Canada), referee stopped contest in first round
 Quarterfinals — Lost to Wladimir Klitschko (Ukraine), referee stopped contest in first round

Canoeing

Cycling

Road Competition
Men's Individual Time Trial
Jan Karlsson 
 Final — 1:08:52 (→ 18th place)

Michael Andersson
 Final — did not finish (→ no ranking)

Women's Individual Road Race
Susanne Ljungskog 
 Final — 02:37:06 (→ 25th place)

Mountain Bike
Men's Cross Country
 Roger Persson
 Final — 2:37:17 (→ 21st place)

Diving

Men's 3m Springboard
Jimmy Sjödin
 Preliminary Heat — 339.93 (→ did not advance, 20th place)

Joakim Andersson
 Preliminary Heat — 331.83 (→ did not advance, 22nd place)

Women's 3m Springboard
Anna Lindberg
 Preliminary Heat — 292.02
 Semi Final — 220.29
 Final — 269.52 (→ 8th place)

Equestrianism

Fencing

Two fencers, one man and one woman, represented Sweden in 1996.

Men's épée
 Péter Vánky

Women's épée
 Helena Elinder

Football

Summary

Women's tournament

Annelie Nilsson  
Cecilia Sandell  
Åsa Jakobsson  
Annika Nessvold  
Kristin Bengtsson  
Anna Pohjanen  
Pia Sundhage  
Malin Swedberg  
Malin Andersson  
Ulrika Kalte  
Lena Videkull  
Ulrika Karlsson  
Camilla Svensson  
Maria Kun  
Julia Carlsson  
Hanna Ljungberg

Handball

Summary

Judo

Modern pentathlon

Men's Individual Competition:
 Per-Olov Danielson — 5375 pts (→ 10th place)

Rowing

Sailing

Shooting

Swimming

Men's 50 m Freestyle
 Pär Lindström
 Heat — 23.47 (→ did not advance, 33rd place)

Men's 100 m Freestyle
 Lars Frölander
 Heat — 49.91
 Final — scratched

Men's 200 m Freestyle
 Anders Holmertz
 Heat — 1:48.41
 Final — 1:48.42 (→ 5th place)

Men's 400 m Freestyle
 Anders Holmertz
 Heat — 3:52.27
 Final — 3:50.66 (→ 5th place)

Men's 100 m Butterfly
 Lars Frölander
 Heat — 54.37 (→ did not advance, 19th place)

Men's 4 × 100 m Freestyle Relay
 Fredrik Letzler, Lars Frölander, Christer Wallin, and Johan Wallberg
 Heat — 3:20.74
 Lars Frölander, Fredrik Letzler, Anders Holmertz, and Christer Wallin
 Final — 3:20.16 (→ 7th place)

Men's 4 × 200 m Freestyle Relay
 Christer Wallin, Lars Frölander, Anders Lyrbring, and Anders Holmertz
 Heat — 7:20.61
 Christer Wallin, Anders Holmertz, Lars Frölander, and Anders Lyrbring
 Final — 7:17.56 (→  Silver Medal)

Women's 50 m Freestyle
 Linda Olofsson
 Heat — 25.84
 Final — 25.63 (→ 6th place)

Women's 100 m Freestyle
 Linda Olofsson
 Heat — 56.56
 B-Final — 55.83 (→ 10th place)

Women's 200 m Freestyle
 Louise Jöhncke
 Heat — 2:01.13
 B-Final — 2:01.37 (→ 11th place)

 Malin Nilsson
 Heat — 2:04.39 (→ did not advance, 24th place)

Women's 100 m Backstroke
 Therese Alshammar
 Heat — 1:03.79
 B-Final — 1:04.15 (→ 16th place)

Women's 100 m Breaststroke
 Hanna Jaltner
 Heat — 1:10.69
 B-Final — 1:11.41 (→ 16th place)

 Maria Östling
 Heat — 1:11.58 (→ did not advance, 23rd place)

Women's 200 m Breaststroke
 Lena Eriksson
 Heat — 2:31.65
 B-Final — 2:28.87 (→ 9th place)

 Maria Östling
 Heat — 2:33.44 (→ did not advance, 21st place)

Women's 100 m Butterfly
 Johanna Sjöberg
 Heat — 1:01.01
 B-Final — 1:00.76 (→ 9th place)

Women's 200 m Individual Medley
 Louise Karlsson
 Heat — 2:16.37
 Final — 2:17.25 (→ 8th place)

Women's 4 × 100 m Freestyle Relay
 Louise Jöhncke, Johanna Sjöberg, Louise Karlsson, and Linda Olofsson
 Heat — 3:45.39 
 Linda Olofsson, Louise Jöhncke, Louise Karlsson, and Johanna Sjöberg
 Final — 3:44.91 (→ 5th place)

Women's 4 × 200 m Freestyle Relay
 Louise Jöhncke, Johanna Sjöberg, Josefin Lillhage, and Åsa Sandlund 
 Heat — 8:13.64 (→ did not advance, 9th place)

Women's 4 × 100 m Medley Relay
 Therese Alshammar, Hanna Jaltner, Johanna Sjöberg, and Louise Jöhncke
 Heat — 4:10.88 (→ did not advance, 10th place)

Table tennis

Tennis

Men's Singles Competition
 Thomas Enqvist
 First round — Defeated Marc-Kevin Goellner (Germany) 7-6 4-6 6-4
 Second round — Defeated Sargis Sargsian (Armenia) 4-6 7-6 6-4
 Third round — Lost to Leander Paes (India) 5-7 6-7

 Magnus Gustafsson
 First round — Defeated Ronald Agénor (Haiti) 6-2 6-4
 Second round — Lost to Greg Rusedski (Great Britain) 7-6 6-7 3-6

Weightlifting

Wrestling

Notes

References

Nations at the 1996 Summer Olympics
1996
Summer Olympics